Khushan may refer to:
 Khushan, Qazvin
 Khushan, Razavi Khorasan